The 2022 Montreal Alouettes season was the 55th season for the team in the Canadian Football League and their 67th overall. The Alouettes finished second in their division, an improvement on their third place finish in 2021 and qualified for the playoffs for the third consecutive season following the team's week 19 victory over the Ottawa Redblacks. However, after defeating the Hamilton Tiger-Cats in the East Semi-Final, the team lost to the Toronto Argonauts in the East Final. The Alouettes held their training camp in Trois-Rivières at Stade Diablos.

The 2022 CFL season was the third season for Khari Jones as the team's head coach and offensive coordinator. However, he was fired after four games on July 6, 2022, where the team started with a 1–3 record. He was replaced by the team's general manager, Danny Maciocia, who was entering his second season with the team. The Alouettes also fired their defensive coordinator and defensive backs coach, Barron Miles, on July 6, 2022, and he was replaced by Noel Thorpe, who returned for his third stint with the club.

Offseason

CFL Global Draft
The 2022 CFL Global Draft took place on May 3, 2022. With the format being a snake draft, the Alouettes selected first in the odd-numbered rounds and ninth in the even-numbered rounds.

CFL National Draft
The 2022 CFL Draft took place on May 3, 2022. The Alouettes had the first overall pick for the first time since 1972 following their trade of the fourth overall pick and the playing rights for Carter O'Donnell to the Edmonton Elks. The team also acquired the ninth overall selection from the Winnipeg Blue Bombers after trading Cameron Lawson. In total, the Alouettes had nine selections in the draft.

Preseason

Schedule

 Games played with blue uniforms.

Regular season

Standings

Schedule

 Games played with white uniforms.
 Games played with blue uniforms.

Post-season

Schedule 

 Games played with white uniforms.
 Games played with blue uniforms.

Team

Roster

Coaching staff

References

External links
 

Montreal Alouettes seasons
2022 Canadian Football League season by team
2022 in Quebec
2020s in Montreal